Trigona branneri is a species of eusocial stingless bee in the family Apidae and tribe Meliponini.

See also 
 Trigona spinipes

References 

branneri
Hymenoptera of South America
Hymenoptera of Brazil
Insects described in 1912